Trans Wonderland (also known as the Trans Amusement Park) is an amusement and theme park in Ibadan, Nigeria.

History
The Trans Wonderland project was initiated in 1987 by the incumbent military Governor at the time: colonel Adetunji Olurin, while construction of the park began in August 1988,following the financial support from the subsequent Governor, Colonel Sasaenia Adedeji Oresanya. The park opened to the public on November 29, 1989.

Attractions
Trans Wonderland is sometimes referred to as Nigeria's Disney World. The park covers a total area of 67 acres.

Attractions include roller coasters, electronic bumper cars, panoramic wheels, ferris wheels, merry-go-round horses, space station, flying chain chairs, dragon boats, funky basket circles and many others. Today, however the park is a shadow of its former self because many of these attractions have fallen into disrepair and they are no longer in good working condition due to maintenance issues. In spite of this, the park is still a popular entertainment venue in Ibadan.

References

Amusement parks in Nigeria
Tourist attractions in Ibadan
1988 establishments in Nigeria
Buildings and structures in Ibadan